A sleeping porch is a deck or balcony, sometimes screened or otherwise enclosed with screened windows, and furnished for sleeping in warmer months. They can be on ground level or on a higher storey and on any side of a home.  A sleeping porch allows residents to sleep on a screened-in porch, avoiding warm convection currents from air and wall materials beneath or beside.  Before affordable electric fans and/or air conditioning were installed, families often created such rooms, well-aired, where children would sleep during summer. The idea dates to around 1900 and became common in much of the United States.

See also

Arizona room 
Screened porch

References

Rooms
Porch